Events from the year 1901 in Canada.

Incumbents

Crown 
 Monarch – Victoria (until January 22) then Edward VII

Federal government 
 Governor General – Gilbert Elliot-Murray-Kynynmound, 4th Earl of Minto 
 Prime Minister – Wilfrid Laurier
 Chief Justice – Samuel Henry Strong (Ontario)
 Parliament – 9th (from 6 February)

Provincial governments

Lieutenant governors 
Lieutenant Governor of British Columbia – Henri-Gustave Joly de Lotbinière
Lieutenant Governor of Manitoba – Daniel Hunter McMillan
Lieutenant Governor of New Brunswick – Jabez Bunting Snowball 
Lieutenant Governor of Nova Scotia – Alfred Gilpin Jones  
Lieutenant Governor of Ontario – Oliver Mowat 
Lieutenant Governor of Prince Edward Island – Peter Adolphus McIntyre 
Lieutenant Governor of Quebec – Louis-Amable Jetté

Premiers 
Premier of British Columbia – Edward Gawler Prior 
Premier of Manitoba – Rodmond Roblin 
Premier of New Brunswick – Lemuel John Tweedie
Premier of Nova Scotia – George Henry Murray 
Premier of Ontario – George William Ross  
Premier of Prince Edward Island – Donald Farquharson (until December 29) then Arthur Peters 
Premier of Quebec – Simon-Napoléon Parent

Territorial governments

Commissioners 
 Commissioner of Yukon – William Ogilvie (until March 11) then James Hamilton Ross

Lieutenant governors 
 Lieutenant Governor of Keewatin – Daniel Hunter McMillan
 Lieutenant Governor of the North-West Territories – Amédée E. Forget

Premiers 
 Premier of North-West Territories – Frederick Haultain

Events
January 22 – Death of Queen Victoria and ascension of King Edward VII 
March 9 — Japanese Canadians win the vote in British Columbia
September 16 – The Duke and Duchess of Cornwall and York (later King George V and Queen Mary) arrive in Quebec City. They visit all provinces (except Prince Edward Island) and the districts of Assiniboia and Alberta in the North-West Territories. They also visit Newfoundland before leaving North America.
December 12 — Guglielmo Marconi receives a transatlantic radio message at St. John's, Newfoundland
December 18 — The Territorial Grain Growers' Association is founded
December 29 — Arthur Peters becomes Premier of Prince Edward Island, replacing Donald Farquharson
First ascent of Mount Assiniboine by James Outram's party

Arts and literature

Births

January to June
January 12 — Jack Humphrey, painter (d.1967)
January 14 — Dana Porter, politician and jurist (d.1967)
January 29 — E. P. Taylor, business tycoon and race horse breeder (d.1989)

March 4 — Wilbur R. Franks, scientist and inventor (d.1986)
March 25 — Wilfrid Eggleston, journalist and chief censor for Canada from 1942 until 1944 (d.1985)
April 15 — Thomas Ricketts, soldier and Victoria Cross recipient in 1918 (d.1967)
May 5 — Donald Buchanan Blue, politician

July to December
July 15 — James Litterick, politician
September 8 — Harold Connolly, journalist, newspaper editor, politician and Premier of Nova Scotia (d.1980)
September 14 — George Carlyle Marler, politician, notary and philatelist (d.1981)
September 15 — Gweneth Lloyd, choreographer
September 22 — Charles Brenton Huggins, physician, physiologist, cancer researcher and Nobel prize laureate (d.1997)
October 14 — John Oates Bower, politician, businessman and executive (d.1981)

Full date unknown
Maryon Pearson, wife of Lester B. Pearson, 14th Prime Minister of Canada (d.1989)

Deaths

January 22 — Victoria, Queen of Canada, since 1867 (b.1819)
March 2 — George Mercer Dawson, scientist and surveyor (b.1849)
May 4 — John Jones Ross, politician and Premier of Quebec (b.1831)
May 7 — George Edwin King, jurist, politician and 2nd Premier of New Brunswick (b.1839)
June 13 — Arthur Sturgis Hardy, lawyer, politician and 4th Premier of Ontario (b.1837)

July 24 — George William Allan, politician and 11th Mayor of Toronto (b.1822)
October 25 — Colin MacDougall, politician and lawyer (b.1834)

Historical Documents

N.W.T. premier says territories are ready for and financially need provincial powers

Influential Liberal MP Frank Oliver objects to immigration of Slavs

Matron and helper at Indian residential school so overworked that spiritual training and teaching children "how to work" is ignored

Manufacturing process described in huge chair factory in Owen Sound, Ontario

Mining and miners in Nanaimo, BC's booming coal industry

Trail, B.C. and its gold, silver and copper smelting operations described

Architect gives examples of good design to counter people's ill-informed criticism

Visitor laments various classes of loafer in British Columbia (Note: racial stereotypes)

Humorous character study of people in dining and smoking cars on train crossing Prairies

Chicken Okra à la Portugaise and other items on Chateau Frontenac menu

References 

 
Years of the 20th century in Canada
Canada
Canada